The Turkwel Hydroelectric Power Station, also Turkwel Dam, is an arch dam on the Turkwel River about  north of Kapenguria in West Pokot County, Kenya. The dam serves several purposes to include hydroelectric power production, irrigation tourism and fisheries. It was constructed between 1986 and 1991.

The power station is located underground downstream and contains two 56 MW Francis turbine-generators.

See also

 List of power stations in Kenya
 List of hydropower stations in Africa

References

External links 

Energy infrastructure completed in 1991
Hydroelectric power stations in Kenya
West Pokot County
Arch dams
Dams completed in 1991
Underground power stations
1991 establishments in Kenya
Dams in Kenya